Kazuashita is the sixth studio album by American experimental music band Gang Gang Dance. It was released on June 22, 2018 under 4AD.

Release
On April 10, 2018, the first single "Lotus" was released. The release of the single, came with the announcement of their new album after a seven-year hiatus. On May 14, 2018, the second single to be released was "J-Tree". The third single "Young Boy (Marika in Amerika)" was released on June 6, 2018.

Production
The album was produced by the band's pianist Brian DeGraw, and recorded at several studios across New York.

Tour
In support of the album, Gang Gang Dance announced a North American tour to take place from June 2018 to October 2018.

Critical reception
Kazuashita was met with "generally favorable" reviews from critics. At Metacritic, which assigns a weighted average rating out of 100 to reviews from mainstream publications, this release received an average score of 74, based on 18 reviews. Aggregator Album of the Year gave the release a 71 out of 100 based on a critical consensus of 18 reviews. AnyDecentMusic? gave a rating of 6.9 out of 10.

Track listing

Personnel

Musicians
 Liz Bougatsos – lead vocals
 Brian DeGraw – guitar, drums
 Josh Diamond – guitar
 Shiyé Bidziil – vocals
 Oliver Payne – vocals
 Ryan Sawyer – drums
 Jack Walls – vocals

Production
 Josh Druckman – engineer
 Heba Kadry – mastering
 Sean Maffucci – engineer
 Patrick Higgins – engineer
 Andrew Barker – engineer
 Jorge Elbrecht – mixer

References

External links
 
 

2018 albums
Gang Gang Dance albums
4AD albums